Valovo is a rural locality (a village) in Kovarditskoye Rural Settlement, Muromsky District, Vladimir Oblast, Russia. The population was 4 as of 2010.

Geography 
Valovo is located 15 km northwest of Murom (the district's administrative centre) by road. Dmitriyevka is the nearest rural locality.

References 

Rural localities in Muromsky District